A deposit-refund system (DRS), also known as deposit-return system, advance deposit fee or deposit-return scheme, is a surcharge on a product when purchased and a rebate when it is returned. A well-known example is when container deposit legislation mandates that a refund is given when reusable packaging is returned. A DRS is a market-based instrument to address externalities, similar to a pigovian tax, with the key difference that a DRS refunds the fee after the product is returned. This provides an incentive to consumers to properly dispose of a product. 

While most commonly used with beverage containers, DRS can be used on other materials including liquid and gaseous wastes. A DRS is used on products such as batteries, tyres, automotive oil, consumer electronics and shipping pallets.

There are three potential advantages of a DRS: it reduces illegal dumping by giving a financial incentive, it makes monitoring and enforcement easier, and evading the costs is difficult.

DRS is said to be based on the principles of Extended Producer Responsibility.

DRS can be either voluntary or mandated by legislation.

See also
Environmental economics
Product stewardship
Circular economy
Waste management

References

Economy and the environment
Recycling
Container deposit legislation